Hellewell is a surname. Notable people with the surname include:

 Alec Hellewell (1880–1934), English footballer
 Ben Hellewell (born 1992), Scottish rugby league footballer
 Parley G. Hellewell (born 1950), United States politician
 Robert de Hellewell (14th century, born 1285), gang member and member of parliament

See also
 Helliwell